SL-164, also known as dicloqualone or DCQ  is an analogue of methaqualone developed in the late 1960s by a team at Sumitomo. SL-164 has similar sedative, hypnotic  and anticonvulsant properties to the parent compound, but was never marketed for clinical use.

References 

Sedatives
Quinazolinones
GABAA receptor positive allosteric modulators